Pamela Hartigan (April 26, 1948 - August 12, 2016) was the Director of the Skoll Centre for Social Entrepreneurship at Saïd Business School, University of Oxford. She was the founding partner of Volans Ventures and was also an advocate for the global non-profit social enterprise Cambia, at the World Economic Forum Davos meetings, and became a Director of Cambia in 2009 until her death.

Education
Hartigan obtained undergraduate and graduate degrees in international economics from Georgetown University's School of Foreign Service and the Institut d'Etudes Européennes in Brussels. She held a master's degree in education from American University and a Ph.D. in human developmental psychology from The Catholic University of America.

Career
Hartigan spent over a decade supporting community-based organizations and working with youth in Washington, D.C. She has served as director of several programs and departments for the World Health Organization, including the Women, Health, and Development Program, the Department of Health Promotion, and the Department for Violence and Injury Prevention.

In October 2000, Hartigan became the first managing director of the Schwab Foundation for Social Entrepreneurship.

In 2008, Hartigan co-authored the book The Power of Unreasonable People: How Social Entrepreneurs Create Markets That Change the World.

References

External links
Podcast Interview with Pamela Hartigan Social Innovation Conversations, February 16, 2008
Dr Pamela Hartigan (1948–2016) Obituary by Saïd Business School, August 12, 2016

American women company founders
Catholic University of America alumni
American University alumni
Academics of Saïd Business School
American venture capitalists
American women academics